Shantadurga, also known as Santeri is the form of the Goddess Durga

 Santeri is also a Finnish male given name
 Santeri Alkio, politician, author and journalist
 Santeri Heiskanen, ice hockey player
 Santeri Mäkinen, footballer
 Santeri Nuorteva, journalist and one of the first members of the Eduskunta
 Santeri Salokivi, landscape painter

Finnish masculine given names